Prepayment may refer to:
 Prepaid mobile phone, mobile phone use
 Prepayment for service, e.g. phone calls
 Prepayment of loan, repaying a loan ahead of schedule
 Deferred expense in accounting
 Stored-value card (see also: Credit card#Prepaid cards)